Leandrina Bulzacchi (28 March 1912 - date of death unknown) was an Italian female middle-distance runner, who won twelve national championships at individual senior level from 1928 to 1938 in two different specialities.

National titles
 Italian Athletics Championships
 800 metres: 1930, 1931, 1934, 1935, 1936, 1937, 1938 (7)
Italian Cross Country Championships
 Cross-country running: 1928, 1935, 1936, 1937, 1938 (5)

References

External links
 
 Leandrina Bulzacchi la gazzella di Soresina 

1912 births
Year of death missing
Date of death unknown
Italian female middle-distance runners